Elisabeth Ingvaldsen (born 22 July 1973) is a Norwegian orienteering competitor and World champion. She won a gold medal in the 1999 World Orienteering Championships with the Norwegian relay team. She received a silver medal in 1997 and bronze medals in 2001, 2003 and 2004.

She won an individual bronze medal in sprint at the 2004 World Orienteering Championships.

References

External links
 
 

1973 births
Living people
Norwegian orienteers
Female orienteers
Foot orienteers
World Orienteering Championships medalists
Competitors at the 2001 World Games
Junior World Orienteering Championships medalists